Sir William Henry Bundey (30 January 1838 – 6 December 1909) was an Australian politician and judge, Attorney-General of South Australia from 27 September 1878 to 10 March 1881.


Early life
Bundey was born in Exbury, Hampshire, England, the second son of James Bundey and his wife Harriett née Lockyer. The family emigrated to South Australia in 1848 after losing money in England. William's father died about a few weeks after his arrival, and the boy, though only 10 years of age, went to work in a solicitor's office. In 1856 he was appointed clerk of the City of Onkaparinga local court, but gave this position up about six years later to become articled to a solicitor. Bundey was practically self-educated but he was a good law student, and he was admitted to the bar in 1865. He became a most effective advocate, especially in criminal cases; he declined to defend prisoners unless he believed in their innocence. In 1878 he was appointed a Queen's Counsel.

Political career
On 14 December 1871, Bundey was elected to the South Australian House of Assembly for Onkaparinga, and from July 1874 to March 1875 was minister for Justice and Education in the third Arthur Blyth ministry. He was responsible for the bill to establish the University of Adelaide. He did not seek re-election in 1875 because of his health, but entered parliament again in 1878 and was Attorney-General in the William Morgan ministry from September 1878 to March 1881. A trip through Europe and the east improved his health. Bundey returned to Adelaide at the end of April 1882. In 1884, he was appointed a judge of the Supreme Court of South Australia,  a position he held for 19 years. He was appointed president of the board of conciliation in 1894, but resigned some 15 months later.

Late life and legacy 
Bundey retired on a pension in 1903, was knighted in 1904, and died on 6 December 1909 at his home at Mount Lofty in South Australia. In 1865 he married Ellen Wardlaw, daughter of Sir William Milne, who survived him with a daughter, Ellen Milne Bundey. Miss Bundey wrote under the name of "Lyell Dunne" and published several volumes of verse.

As a young man Bundey was a captain in the Volunteer Military Movement and later became an expert yachtsman; he was also a cricket enthusiast. He was vice-commodore of the South Australian Yacht Squadron in 1870–74 and commodore in 1874–84. He published his Reminiscences of 25 Years' Yachting in Australia in 1888. As a politician he was responsible for the supreme court act, the district courts act, and insolvency and public trustee acts. As a judge he was courteous and particularly anxious to preserve the rights of the subject, and concerned that prisoners who were not defended should receive justice. He published several pamphlets including Land Reform, Education, Trades Unions (1889), Some Thoughts on the Administration of the Criminal Law (1891), Conviction of Innocent Men (1900).

See also
Hundred of Bundey (South Australia)
Hundred of Bundey (Northern Territory)

References

 

1838 births
1909 deaths
Judges of the Supreme Court of South Australia
Members of the South Australian House of Assembly
English emigrants to colonial Australia
Australian King's Counsel
Colony of South Australia judges
19th-century Australian politicians
Attorneys-General of South Australia